is a Japanese footballer who plays for ReinMeer Aomori.

Club statistics
Updated to 23 February 2018.

References

External links

Profile at Azul Claro Numazu

1988 births
Living people
Association football people from Hokkaido
Japanese footballers
J3 League players
Japan Football League players
Japan Soccer College players
Iwate Grulla Morioka players
Azul Claro Numazu players
ReinMeer Aomori players
Association football midfielders
People from Kitami, Hokkaido